Simiskina phalia is a butterfly in the family Lycaenidae. It was described by William Chapman Hewitson in 1874. It is found in the Indomalayan realm.

Subspecies
Simiskina phalia phalia (Borneo, Sumatra)
Simiskina phalia potina (Hewitson, 1874) (southern Burma, Thailand to Peninsular Malaysia, Singapore)
Simiskina phalia morishitai Hayashi, 1976 Palawan

References

External links
Simiskina at Markku Savela's Lepidoptera and Some Other Life Forms

Simiskina
Butterflies described in 1874
Butterflies of Asia
Taxa named by William Chapman Hewitson